Elena Tairova (28 August 1991 – 16 March 2010) was a Belarusian and Russian chess player. She was awarded the FIDE titles of Woman Grandmaster (WGM) in 2006 and International Master (IM) in 2007.

Tairova won the gold medal at the European Youth Chess Championships in the Girls U10 category in 2001, playing for Belarus, and the World Youth Chess Championships in the Girls U14 section in 2005, representing Russia. She was the silver medallist in the European Youth Championships in the Girls U12 category in 2003 and the Girls U14 in 2004. Also in 2004, Tairova won the bronze medal at the 
World Youth Championships in the Girls U14 category.

In 2006, she won the Russian U-20 girls championship and finished second in the Superfinal of the Russian women's championship.

In May 2007, Tairova played board five for the Russian team that won the silver medal in the 1st Women's World Team Chess Championship in Yekaterinburg.
In July 2007, she finished third in the Queens Woman Grandmasters tournament in Bad Homburg, behind Zhao Xue and Elisabeth Pähtz respectively.
In the same year, she participated in the Russia vs China match and tied for first at the Russian Women's Superfinal, beating Nadezhda Kosintseva, among others.

On 16 March 2010, Tairova died from a chronic undisclosed illness at the age of 18.

References

External links
Elena Tairova chess games at 365Chess.com
Alena Tairova chess games at 365Chess.com

Elena Tairova team chess record at Olimpbase.org

1991 births
2010 deaths
Chess International Masters
Chess woman grandmasters
World Youth Chess Champions
Belarusian female chess players
Russian female chess players
Chess players from Minsk
Place of death missing